"Dancing Your Memory Away" is a song recorded by American country music artist Charly McClain.  It was released in June 1982 as the first single from the album Too Good to Hurry.  The song reached number three on the Billboard Hot Country Singles & Tracks chart.

The song was written by Eddie Burton and Thomas Alan Grant for Barnwood Music which is now owned by HoriPro Entertainment. "Dancing Your Memory Away" also won two BMI awards, one at the country awards in Nashville and the other at the pop awards in Beverly Hills, CA. The song was first recorded by Tammy Wynette for her Soft Touch album. The Charly McClain version was produced by Norro Wilson. It has since been recorded by over 30 different artists around the world.

Charts

Weekly charts

Year-end charts

References

1982 singles
1982 songs
Tammy Wynette songs
Charly McClain songs
Song recordings produced by Norro Wilson
Epic Records singles